LeRoy Abrams (1874–1956) was an American botanist and writer. He was a Professor of Botany at Stanford University. He wrote and illustrated a four-volume Illustrated Flora of the Pacific States, with the final volume published posthumously, after compilation and editing by Roxanna Ferris.

He and his wife had a home overlooking the Santa Clara Valley. Their only child, a daughter, predeceased him.

Bibliography

References 

1874 births
1956 deaths
Stanford University faculty
American botanists
American botanical writers
Botanical illustrators